Therapeutic Advances in Psychopharmacology is a peer-reviewed open access scientific journal. Publication began in February, 2011, and continues today.

References

External links 
 This journal is archived online by the NIH at 

Pharmacology journals
Publications established in 2011
English-language journals